Rutledge Run is a stream in Iron and Washington Counties in the U.S. state of Missouri. It is a tributary of Cedar Creek.

Rutledge Run has the name of the local Rutledge family.

See also
List of rivers of Missouri

References

Rivers of Iron County, Missouri
Rivers of Washington County, Missouri
Rivers of Missouri